Seventh Avenue most commonly refers to Seventh Avenue (Manhattan), a street in Manhattan, New York City.

The name may also be used to reference:

Streets and transportation
 Seventh Avenue, Newark, a neighborhood in Newark, New Jersey
 Seventh Avenue (BMT Brighton Line) a New York City Subway station in Brooklyn; serving the  trains
 Seventh Avenue (IND Culver Line) a New York City Subway station in Brooklyn; serving the  trains
 Seventh Avenue (IND lines) a New York City Subway station in Manhattan, also on the IND Sixth Avenue Line; serving the  trains
 Seventh Avenue (Islamabad), a road in Islamabad
 IRT Broadway–Seventh Avenue Line, a portion of the New York City Subway

Other uses
 Seventh Avenue (band), a Christian heavy metal band from Germany
 Seventh Avenue, a British boyband formed by Ian Levine
 "Seventh Avenue", a song by Ratt from Dancing Undercover 
 Seventh Avenue, a mail-order catalog operated by Colony Brands
 Seventh Avenue (novel), a 1966 novel by Norman Bogner
 Seventh Avenue (miniseries), a 1977 TV miniseries based on the Bogner novel
 7th Avenue (album), an album by rapper KJ-52